This was a new event on the 2013 ITF Women's Circuit at São Paulo's Clube Hebraica as the men's ATP Challenger Tour came to the Brazilian city again after April's IS Open de Tênis.

Roxane Vaisemberg was the defending champion from 2012's $10,000 event at São Paulo's Clube Painieras do Morumby, but lost in the first round to Bianca Botto.

Botto went on to win the tournament, defeating Gabriela Cé in the final, 7–6(7–2), 5–7, 6–2.

Seeds

Main draw

Finals

Top half

Bottom half

References

External links 
 Main draw

Sao Paulo Challenger de Tenis - Women's Singles
Tennis tournaments in Brazil